Kwalee Ltd. is a British video game developer and publisher. The company was founded in May 2011 by David Darling, co-founder and former CEO of Codemasters who is hailed as one of the 'founding fathers' of the UK games industry. The company publishes games on mobile, PC and console platforms. It is known for its hypercasual games for iOS and Android devices, with a large internal development studio helping the company to more than 700 million game downloads in total. Based in Leamington Spa in the county of Warwickshire, Kwalee is one of the several companies that make up the Leamington Spa video gaming cluster.

As of 2022, the company also has offices in Bangalore, Beijing and Portugal.

Kwalee employs over 180 technical, marketing, publishing and administrative staff in its offices, including Andrew Graham (designer and programmer of Micro Machines) and COO Jason Falcus (programmer of NBA Jam). In 2020, the company began to publish PC and console games with Max Everingham joining from Team17 to head up a new division. TENS! and Eternal Hope were the first PC and console game releases from Kwalee, with the one-hit-kill fighting game Die by the Blade set to launch in 2023, shifting away from its initial plan to release the game in November 2022.

The Kwalee Name 
Kwalee is the Australian Aboriginal for “wait for me,” used as the name for a sailboat belonging to David Darling's grandfather, who taught him electronics. During his youth, Darling sailed on it frequently, thus the name Kwalee is a homage to the grandfather who inspired his career path.

Third-Party Publishing 
In 2019, Kwalee launched the publishing side of its business. This team works with third-party developers to help their games reach a wider audience by signing and publishing them under the Kwalee brand.

Successes of the Kwalee publishing department include Rocket Sky! from developer DP Space AG, which has been a number one app in 11 countries including the United Kingdom, France and Australia, and OverTake, a 2020 driving title that has been the number one iOS game in countries including the United Kingdom, Australia and more.

On 24 January 2022, Kwalee acquired Tictales.

'Creative Wednesdays' and Profit Sharing 
Kwalee offers an opportunity to all of its employees in the form of its 'Creative Wednesdays', where any member of staff is encouraged to pitch ideas for games on a weekly basis. Some of these ideas are then made by Kwalee's internal development and launched to the world. Kwalee state that they "rely on them [the ideas] to power our internal development."

Alongside 'Creative Wednesdays', Kwalee rewards all of their employees for the success of the games they create via a profit sharing scheme. In just over one year, the scheme paid out over £1 million to its employees, with "a base amount that goes to everyone no matter the role, which is added to based on how closely the work of the individual has related to the success and profit of particular games".

Since the success of Teacher Simulator, Kwalee donated 100% of the game's UK profits obtained during the first week of the school term to FareShare, in their efforts to tackle child food poverty in the United Kingdom.

Published Titles

Mobile Games

PC & Console Games

Awards 
In 2012, Kwalee was named in the Startups 100 awards as one of the UK's most innovative, inspiring and ground-breaking new companies.

In 2019, its game Shootout 3D was awarded a TIGA award for 'Best Puzzle Game'.

In App Annie's Top Publisher Awards 2021, awarded based on overall mobile downloads throughout 2020, Kwalee was named the UK's biggest mobile game publisher by downloads and the UK's third highest-ranked app publisher overall behind the BBC and the NHS.

In 2021, Kwalee was nominated in the Best Publisher and Best Developer categories at the PocketGamer.biz Mobile Game Awards.

In November 2022, the company won the title as Publisher of the Year at the TIGA Games Industry Awards 2022.

It was also named in the Top 50 Mobile Game Makers of 2021.

References

External links 
 

Video game development companies
Video game companies of the United Kingdom
British companies established in 2011
Video game companies established in 2011
Companies based in Leamington Spa
2011 establishments in England